Notre-Dame-de-Lourdes is a municipality in the Lanaudière region of Quebec, Canada, part of the Joliette Regional County Municipality. It is located along the eastern shores of the L'Assomption River.

Demographics
Population trend:
 Population in 2021: 3141 (2016 to 2021 population change: 12.9%)
 Population in 2016: 2783 (2011 to 2016 population change: 7.2%)
 Population in 2011: 2595 (2006 to 2011 population change: 17.9%)
 Population in 2006: 2201 (2001 to 2006 population change: 1.1%)
 Population in 2001: 2176
 Population in 1996: 2087
 Population in 1991: 2060

Private dwellings occupied by usual residents: 1298 (total dwellings: 1352)

Mother tongue:
 English as first language: 0.8%
 French as first language: 97.2%
 English and French as first language: 0.8%
 Other as first language: 1%

Education

Commission scolaire des Samares operates francophone public schools, including:
 École Sainte-Bernadette

The Sir Wilfrid Laurier School Board operates anglophone public schools, including:
 Joliette Elementary School in Saint-Charles-Borromée
 Joliette High School in Joliette

See also
List of municipalities in Quebec

References

External links

Incorporated places in Lanaudière
Municipalities in Quebec